The Wedding Year is a 2019 American romantic comedy film directed by Robert Luketic and starring Sarah Hyland, Tyler James Williams, Jenna Dewan, Matt Shively and Anna Camp.

It was released on September 20, 2019, by Entertainment Studios Motion Pictures.

Premise
Los Angeles photographer, Mara Baylor, "isn’t sure she is the marrying type and her new ready-to-settle-down boyfriend and commitment issues are put to the test when she is invited to 7 weddings in the same year", putting "pressure on Mara to make some big decisions."

Cast

 Sarah Hyland as Mara Baylor
 Tyler James Williams as Jake Riddick
 Jenna Dewan as Jessica
 Matt Shively as Alex
 Anna Camp as Ellie
 Noureen DeWulf as Boss Queen
 Wanda Sykes as Janet/Grandma
 Keith David as Preston
 Grace Helbig as Kelly
 Benton Jennings as Waiter
 Darlene Vogel as Mother
 Patrick Warburton as Michael
 Kristen Johnston as Barbara
 Camille Hyde as Nicole
 Zora Bikangaga as Robbie
 Laci Mosley as Violet
 Tom Connolly as Zak
 Martin Martinez as Alex
 Danielle Bux as Megan
 Ryan Malaty as Ron
 Dominic Leeder as Brendan
 Jimmy Walker Jr. as Pastor Watkins
 Thomas Kasp as Peter

Production

Development
On August 4, 2016, it was reported that Lakeshore Entertainment has acquired a romantic comedy spec script written by Donald Diego. On May 1, 2018, it was announced that Lakeshore would be presenting the movie for sales at the 2018 Cannes Film Festival.

The film will be directed by Robert Luketic, produced by Gary Lucchesi, Marc Reid, and Mark Korshak, and executive produced by Sarah Hyland.

Casting
On May 1, 2018, it was announced that Sarah Hyland would play the lead in the romantic comedy as Los Angeles photographer, Mara Baylor. On May 29, 2018, Tyler James Williams joined the production as Jake Riddick, the boyfriend of Mara Baylor. On May 30, 2018, it was announced that Anna Camp, Wanda Sykes, Jenna Dewan, Keith David, Patrick Warburton, Tom Connolly, Grace Helbig and Fred Grandy would also be joining the production. However, Grandy was not in the final production.

Filming
Principal photography for the film begin on May 21, 2018, in Los Angeles, United States. Filming concluded on July 10, 2018.

Release
In May 2019, Entertainment Studios Motion Pictures acquired distribution rights to the film.

The film was released on September 20, 2019.

References

External links
 
 

2019 films
American romantic comedy films
Films about interracial romance
Films directed by Robert Luketic
Entertainment Studios films
Lakeshore Entertainment films
2010s English-language films
2010s American films